A list of animated feature films released in 2000

Highest-grossing animated films of the year

See also
 List of animated television series of 2000

References

 Feature films
2000
2000-related lists